Yenikent is a town in Günyüzü district, Eskişehir, Turkey. The population of Yenikent has decreased from 472 in 2007 to 362 in 2021; of which 192 were male and 172 were female.

References 

Eskişehir